Hans Granlid (22 December 1926 – 10 May 1999) was a Swedish novelist and literary researcher. Among his novels are Nertrappning from 1969, and Hotellsaga from 1972. He was awarded the Dobloug Prize in 1991.

References

1926 births
1999 deaths
20th-century Swedish novelists
Dobloug Prize winners
Swedish male novelists
20th-century Swedish male writers